Chernushka is the name of several inhabited localities in Russia.

Urban localities
Chernushka, Chernushinsky District, Perm Krai, a town in Chernushinsky District of Perm Krai

Rural localities
Chernushka, Arbazhsky District, Kirov Oblast, a village in Shembetsky Rural Okrug of Arbazhsky District in Kirov Oblast; 
Chernushka, Kilmezsky District, Kirov Oblast, a settlement in Chernushsky Rural Okrug of Kilmezsky District in Kirov Oblast; 
Chernushka, Komi Republic, a village in Verkholuzye selo Administrative Territory of Priluzsky District in the Komi Republic; 
Chernushka, Kurgan Oblast, a village in Zyryansky Selsoviet of Kataysky District in Kurgan Oblast; 
Chernushka, Mari El Republic, a settlement in Sidorovsky Rural Okrug of Medvedevsky District in the Mari El Republic; 
Chernushka, Chaykovsky, Perm Krai, a settlement under the administrative jurisdiction of the town of krai significance of Chaykovsky in Perm Krai
Chernushka, Tver Oblast, a village in Nelidovskoye Rural Settlement of Nelidovsky District in Tver Oblast
Chernushka, Udmurt Republic, a village in Churovsky Selsoviet of Yakshur-Bodyinsky District in the Udmurt Republic
Chernushka, Vologda Oblast, a village in Zelentsovsky Selsoviet of Nikolsky District in Vologda Oblast